Hardcore Devo: Volume One is the first of two collections of demos by the American new wave band Devo. It was originally released in 1990, on the label Rykodisc.

Background
The Hardcore Devo albums are collections of 4-track basement demos recorded by the band between 1974 and 1977. Some tracks are earlier versions of some of Devo's best known tracks that would later be re-recorded and used on subsequent Devo records (e.g. "Jocko Homo", "Mongoloid"), but a majority of the tracks were never re-used and remained unreleased until the Hardcore Devo compilations.

Hardcore Devo: Volume One was out of print for years; however, it was re-issued by Superior Viaduct in 2013, both as a vinyl release (May 2013) and a CD containing both volumes and bonus tracks (July 2013).

Track listing

 The original release also had a limited vinyl pressing in France. This version combined "Auto Modown" and "Space Girl Blues" on a single track.

Personnel
Credits adapted from liner notes of Superior Viaduct 2013 reissue:

Devo
Gerald Casale – vocals (2–4, 9–12, 14–15), backing vocals (5, 6, 7), bass guitar
Mark Mothersbaugh – vocals (1, 5–8, 13), backing vocals (9, 14), synthesizer
Bob Mothersbaugh – backing vocals (4–7, 9–10, 15), guitar
Jim Mothersbaugh – drums (1–4, 7–11, 14)

Additional personnel
Bob Casale – additional guitar (5–6, 11, 13–15)
Alan Myers – drums (5–6, 12–13, 15)

Technical
Credits adapted from liner notes of original Rykodisc 1991 issue:

Devo – engineering, mixing
Barbara Watson – photography
Koepke Design Group – package design
Bernie Grundman – mastering

Credits adapted from Devo: The Brand (2018):

Devo – photo concept, art direction
Moshe Brakha – photography

See also
Hardcore Devo: Volume Two

References

External links

Devo compilation albums
Demo albums
1985 compilation albums
Rykodisc compilation albums